Yasuhara (written: 安原) is a Japanese surname. Notable people with the surname include:

, Japanese video game designer
, Japanese cyclist
, Japanese footballer and manager
, Japanese voice actress
, Japanese actor and voice actor

Japanese-language surnames